Yilan City (Mandarin pinyin: Yílán Shì; Hokkien POJ: Gî-lân-chhī) is a county-administered city and the county seat of Yilan County, Taiwan Province, Republic of China. The city lies on the north side of the Lanyang River.

History
The Yilan Plain in which the city is located has historically been referred to as Kapalan, Kapsulan (also 甲子蘭),  Komalan, etc. These names, as well as that of Yilan itself, were given to the sites by the Kavalan tribe of Taiwanese aborigines. Later arrivals included Han Chinese settlers during the Qing Dynasty in China (1802) and settlers from Okinawa during Taiwan's Japanese era (1895-1945).

Qing Dynasty
In 1810 under Qing dynasty rule, a formal administration office was established at Wuwei (五圍) and "Komalan Subprefecture" was at the present day location of Yilan City. Construction of the city wall was completed a year later. After a few years once the basic infrastructure was ready, the city assumed the political, economical, cultural and educational center for the Lanyang Plain. In 1878, Komalan was a large rice production area commonly called Kapsulan, and became a district called Gilan Hsien. It was one of the three new districts that constituted the new Taipeh Prefecture.

Empire of Japan

According to the 1904 census, the population of Giran town was about 15,000.

Republic of China

After the handover of Taiwan from Japan to the Republic of China on 25 October 1945, Yilan City was created in January 1946 as a county-administered city the county seat of the newly created Yilan County and continue to become the political, economical and cultural centers of the region.

Geography

Yilan City is located on Lanyang Plain with an average altitude of 7.38 meters above sea level.

 Area: 
 Population: 94,813 (February 2023)

Climate
Yilan City experiences a humid subtropical climate (Köppen: Cfa) with mild winters and hot, humid summers.

Administrative divisions
Yilan City consists of 38 villages and 478 neighborhoods, including:
Baili, Beijin, Beimen, Caiyuan, Chenggong, Cian, Daxin, Fuguo, Fuxing, Jianjun, Jianye, Jiaobai, Jinshi, Kaixuan, Liming, Meizhou, Minquan, Minzu, Nanjin, Nanmen, Nanqiao, Qijie, Qizhang, Shennong, Siyuan, Taishan, Dongcun, Dongmen/Tungmen, Wenhua, Xiaolian, Xiaodong, Ximen, Xinmin, Xinsheng, Xindong, Yanping, Zhongshan and Zhongxing

Government institutions
 Yilan County Government
 Yilan County Council
 Institute of Yilan County History

Tourist attractions
 Former Yilan Prison
 Memorial Hall of Founding of Yilan Administration
 Yilan Brick Kiln
 Yilan Confucian Temple
 Yilan Distillery Chia Chi Lan Wine Museum
 Yilan Literary Museum
 Yilan Museum of Art

Transportation

Yilan City is accessible by Yilan Station of the Taiwan Railways.

References

Bibliography

External links

Northeast and Yilan Coast National Scenic Area

County-administered cities of Taiwan
Populated places in Yilan County, Taiwan